Yelnya is the name of several inhabited localities in Russia.

Urban localities
Yelnya, Yelninsky District, Smolensk Oblast, a town in Yelninsky District of Smolensk Oblast; administratively incorporated as Yelninskoye Urban Settlement

Rural localities
Yelnya, Bryansk Oblast, a village in Krasnovichsky Selsoviet of Unechsky District of Bryansk Oblast
Yelnya, Mozhaysky District, Moscow Oblast, a village in Borisovskoye Rural Settlement of Mozhaysky District of Moscow Oblast
Yelnya, Noginsky District, Moscow Oblast, a village in Akseno-Butyrskoye Rural Settlement of Noginsky District of Moscow Oblast
Yelnya, Gagarinsky District, Smolensk Oblast, a village in Yelninskoye Rural Settlement of Gagarinsky District of Smolensk Oblast
Yelnya, Rudnyansky District, Smolensk Oblast, a village in Smoligovskoye Rural Settlement of Rudnyansky District of Smolensk Oblast

See also 
Yelnya Reserve in Belarus